The Shire of Pyrenees is a local government area (LGA) in Victoria, Australia, located in the western part of the state.

It includes the towns of Avoca, Beaufort, Lexton and Trawalla. It was formed in 1994 from the amalgamation of the Shire of Avoca, Shire of Lexton and Shire of Ripon.

The Shire is governed and administered by the Pyrenees Shire Council; its seat of local government and administrative centre is located at the council headquarters in Beaufort, it also has a service centre located in Avoca. The Shire is named after the major geographical feature in the region, The Pyrenees Ranges which also gives its name to the Pyrenees wine region, which is located in the north of the Local Government Area.

Council

Current composition
The council is composed of five wards and five councillors, with one councillor per ward elected to represent each ward. Council Composition as of September 2022:

Administration and governance
The council meets in the council chambers at the council headquarters in the Beaufort Municipal Offices, which is also the location of the council's administrative activities. It also provides customer services at both its administrative centre in Beaufort, and its service centre in Avoca.

Traditional owners 
The traditional owners of this land are the Wadawurrung, Dja Dja Wurrung, Wotjobaluk and Eastern Maar.

Townships and localities
The 2021 census, the shire had a population of 7,671 up from 7,238 in the 2016 census

^ - Territory divided with another LGA

References

External links
Pyrenees Shire Council official website
Metlink local public transport map
Link to Land Victoria interactive maps
Avoca and District Historical Society Inc
https://web.archive.org/web/20110203095139/http://www.moonambel-pyrenees.com/

Local government areas of Victoria (Australia)
Grampians (region)